Danmarks Næste Topmodel, cycle 3 was the third cycle of the show. Caroline Fleming and Uffe Buchard remained on the show while Jacqueline Friis-Mikkelsen left the panel. New judges were model and sex symbol Oliver Bjerrehuus and Unique-casting agent Jesper Thomsen. The show began to air on September 20, 2012.

Like in the previous cycle, the call out order at the elimination process is now random and every girl learns her verdict individually whether she makes it to the next round or not. This format has been adapted from Germany's Next Topmodel.

Among with the prizes was a modeling contract with Unique Model Management and the cover spread in COVER magazine Denmark.

Line Rehkopff was crowned the winner of the season.

Contestants

(ages stated are at start of contest)

Episode summaries

Episode 1

This was the casting episode.

Episode 2
Wall of fame: Gudrun Eir Hermannsdottir
Eliminated: Bianca Weisshaupt
Bottom two: Yasmina Bach & Simone Pedersen
Eliminated: Simone Pedersen

Episode 3
Challenge winner: Christina Birk Simonsen
Wall of fame: Nanna Wentzel
Eliminated: Yasmina Bach

Episode 4
Challenge winner: Line Rehkopff 
Wall of fame: Julie Lillelund
Bottom two: Marie Louise Bang & Caroline Baastrup Larsen
Eliminated: Caroline Baastrup Larsen

Episode 5
Challenge winner: Line Rehkopff 
Wall of Fame: Gudrun Eir Hermannsdottir
Bottom two: Ida Gottlieb & Julie Lillelund
Eliminated: Ida Gottlieb

Episode 6
Challenge winner: Anna Møller Levsen
Wall of fame: Julie Lillelund
Bottom two: Sasja Andersen & Nanna Wentzel
Eliminated: Sasja Andersen

Episode 7
Eliminated outside of judging panel: Nanna Wentzel
Challenge winner: Line Rehkopff 
Wall of fame: Marie Louise Bang
Bottom two: Emma Rolsted Jensen & Hanna Rolsted Jensen
Eliminated: Hanna Rolsted Jensen

Episode 8
Challenge winner: Julie Lillelund
Wall of fame: Julie Lillelund
Eliminated: Christina Birk Simonsen
Bottom two: Line Rehkopff & Emma Rolsted Jensen
Eliminated: Emma Rolsted Jensen

Episode 9
Challenge winner: Marie Louise Bang
Wall of fame: Line Rehkopff 
Eliminated: Anna Møller Levsen
Bottom two:  Gudrun Eir Hermannsdottir & Julie Lillelund
Eliminated:  Gudrun Eir Hermannsdottir

Episode 10
Final three: Julie Lillelund, Line Rehkopff & Marie Louise Bang
Second runner-up: Marie Louise Bang
Runner-up: Julie Lillelund
Danmarks Næste Topmodel: Line Rehkopff

Summaries

Results table

 The contestant won photo of the week
 The contestant was eliminated outside the judging panel
 The contestant was in danger of elimination
 The contestant was eliminated
 The contestant won the competition

Photo shoot guide
Episode 1 photo shoot: Metallic swimsuits (casting)
Episode 2 photo shoot: Rock stars
Episode 3 photo shoot: Posing on a mound of hay
Episode 4 photo shoot: Couture delivery for ILVA
Episode 5 music video: Chemistry with Christopher
Episode 6 photo shoot: Trailer trash
Episode 7 photo shoot: Lingerie in Milan
Episode 8 photo shoot: 'Rich bitches'
Episode 9 photo shoot: Covers for COVER magazine
Episode 10 photo shoot: Celebrity beauty shots

Post–Topmodel careers

Simone Pedersen signed with CPH Wolves Models and 1st Option Model Management. She has taken a couple of test shots and modeled for Herrernes Magasin. She retired from modeling in 2014.
Yasmina Bach  signed with CPH Wolves Models and has taken a couple of test shots. She is also represent Denmark in the Top Model of the World 2014. She retired from modeling in 2015.
Caroline Baastrup Larsen signed with CPH Wolves Models. She has taken a couple of test shots until retired from modeling in 2014.
Ida Gottlieb signed with JNG Management in Hamburg. She has taken a couple of test shots and modeled for Blanka Luz Fashion. She appeared several times on the cover and editorials for Paf magazine #18 winter 2014, #22 winter 2015, #28 summer 2017,... In 2019, Gottlieb retired from modeling and begin pursuing an acting career, which she has appeared on several short films.
Hanna Rolsted Jensen has taken a couple of test shots and modeled for Celina Christensen. She retired from modeling in 2017.
Emma Rolsted Jensen signed with an modeling agency and has modeled in Asia. She has taken a couple of test shots and modeled for Celina Christensen, Z-hair Frederiksberg,... She retired from modeling in 2018.
Christina Birk Simonsen signed with Highline Fashion modeling agency. She has taken a couple of test shots and walked in fashion show of Elsa Adams during Fashion Event 2015. She retired from modeling in 2019.
Gudrun Eir Hermannsdottir signed with JNG Management in Hamburg and Elite Model Management in Bangkok. She has taken a couple of test shots, appeared on an editorials for Bride magazine Thailand December 2013 and walked in fashion show for several designers during Central Chidlom Presents Thai Designer Fashion Party 2013. She has modeled for Karim Design CPH lookbook 2013, BSC Lingerie catalogue, Sperry Top-Sider Thailand,... and she has modeled in China. She retired from modeling in 2015.
Anna Levsen signed with Le Management, Unique Models and Flash Model Management in Istanbul. She has taken a couple of test shots and modeled for ONEofONE by Maibritt Kokholm, ONLY Official,...
Marie Louise Bang signed with Unique Models, Le Management, Metropolitan Models in Paris, Next Management in Miami, Mega Model Agency in Hamburg, Nevs Models in London, Dulcedo Models in Montreal and Outlaws Model Management in Cape Town. She has also walked in fashion shows for Sofifi during Copenhagen Fashion Week 2013, Hema Kaul during London Fashion Week SS15,... She appeared on the cover and editorials for Natural Medicine magazine June 2014, Cover magazine, Woman magazine,... Bang has modeled and shooting campaigns for Sparkz Danmark, Noisy May jeans, Viola Sky, Miss Baron Fashion spring 2017, Lisca Fashion F/W 2018, Vila Clothes, Zalando,... She retired from modeling in 2019.
Julie Lillelund signed with Unique Models. She has taken a couple of test shots until retired from modeling in 2013.
Line Rehkopff has collected her prizes and signed with Unique Models. She is also signed with Elite Model Management Copenhagen and has modeled and shooting campaigns for Sparkz Danmark, Bianco Footwear, Decoy Clothing A/W 13 collection, NWHR Clothing,... She has also walked in fashion shows for several designers during Copenhagen Fashion Week 2013 such as Est. 1995 Benedikte Utzon Wardrobe AW 13, By Malene Birger AW 13, Peter Jensen Fall 2013,... She retired from modeling in 2015.

References

Danmarks Næste Topmodel
2012 Danish television seasons